DierenPark Amersfoort is a  zoo located on the West side of Amersfoort, in the province of Utrecht, on the edge of the Birkhoven forest, in the Netherlands.

History
The zoo was founded on 22 May 1948 by Mr. Tertoolen and Mr. Knoester. Initially it was a very small zoo with a monkey, a bear, a camel and some farm animals. In the years afterwards the first carnivore arrived, and in 1956 the elephants Indra and Rani arrived.

In 1960, Mr. and Mrs. Vis-Tertoolen, one of the zoo founder's daughters and her husband, took over the management of the zoo, and the first of the chimpanzees arrived.

In 1979, 2 white southern white lions were born, but while growing up they became normally colored. In 1982 seven Sudan cheetahs were born. In 1988, the park got a savanna area and "De Ark van Amersfoort" (Amersfoort's Ark) was opened. It is home to more than 100 animal species and hosts about 800,000 visitors annually.

On September 4, 2019, the zoo's last white tiger, Maxie, died of lung cancer. She was 16 years old.

Themed areas

The park contains the following themed areas:

 The Savanna (since 1989)
 Multiple animals live together on the 'Savanne'. These are a male group of northern giraffes, grévy zebras and helmeted guineafowls. The newest addition to the 'Savanne' are the impalas and the east African oryxes.

 Japanese garden (since 1994)

 In the Japanese garden, where there is a possibility to calm down, leads a path to a pond, the home to the Koi carp, and ends at the home of the Japanese crane.

 De Stad der Oudheid (since May 1999)
 This area that looks like the remains of an old town, provides a home for multiple animals. These are among others camels, lions, siberian tigers, hamadryas baboons and griffon vultures. A part of the latter group moved to the 'Snavelrijk' area in 2014.

 The Night (since 2003)
 The biological rhythm in this building is turned around. Darkness appears during the day, and the other way around. This exhibit is full with nocturnal animals from Australia, South America and Africa, like the Linnaeus's two-toed sloth, common brushtail possum and three-striped night monkey.

 Het Rijk der Reuzen (since 2009)

 The elephant's area is called 'Het Rijk der Reuzen'. The inside exhibit opened in 2009, and is with around 750 m2 the biggest inside exhibit in the Netherlands, and the third largest of Europe. The 3300 m2 outside exhibit opened 6 June 2010.

 De Grote Wildernis (since 2014)
 This is an expansion area on the back side of the zoo. In 2014 Snavelrijk opened, making it the first step of the expansion. The second part of the expansion opened in July 2015, containing a water cycle trail called 'Expeditie Rivier', where visitors cycle next to exhibits and are able to see animals up-close.

 Het Woud (since 9 July 2016)
Here you visit a Dutch forest, with wolves, European badgers and garden dormouses.

Animal collection
Below is an overview of the animal collection from DierenPark Amersfoort. The fishes and invertebrates lists are incomplete.

Incidents
On November 3, 2020 two male chimpanzees, Mike en Karibuna, escaped their enclosures due to human error. To prevent further escalation, the two male chimpanzees were shot. No visitors or employees were injured.

References

External links
 
 Official website DierenPark Amersfoort
http://www.netherlands-tourism.com/dierenpark-amersfoort-amersfoort-zoo/

Zoos in the Netherlands
Tourist attractions in Utrecht (province)
Buildings and structures in Amersfoort
Amersfoort